Direct Internet Access System is a technology used to access internet through DSL developed jointly by IIT Madras and Banyan Networks. It offers a wired solution for high-speed symmetrical Internet access through existing public switched telephone network lines and provides an " Always On" Internet Access that is permanently available at the customer's premises. It uses the existing cabling infrastructure by combining voice and data packets onto a single twisted-pair wire at the subscriber's premises.

The speed of this type of internet access depends upon the distance of the customer's residence from the nearest office of the broadband company.

For example:
 A customer having a distance of 2.5 km from the office will have a speed of 2 Mbit/s 
 A customer having a distance of 5 km from the office may have a speed of 128 kbit/s

External links
 Arun, C P; Smijesh, P S; Direct Internet Access System (DIAS), jointly developed by Banyan Networks and TeNeT Group, liT Madras, (Sree Narayana Gurukulam College of Engineering) ARUN C P 2005-06.pdf
 'IIT Madras develops direct Internet access system' The Times of India, December 18, 1999 (TeNeT Group IIT-M Press)
 Patent WO2001052460A2 - A direct internet access system - Google Patents

Digital subscriber line